Acetanisole is an aromatic chemical compound with an aroma described as sweet, fruity, nutty, and similar to vanilla. In addition Acetanisole can sometimes smell like butter or caramel.   

Acetanisole is found naturally in castoreum, the glandular secretion of the beaver.

Preparation
Acetanisole can be prepared synthetically by Friedel-Crafts acylation of anisole with acetyl chloride:

Application
It is used as a cigarette additive, a fragrance, and a flavoring in food.

References 

Food additives
Piceol ethers
Sweet-smelling chemicals